William Pamplin (5 August 1806 – 9 September 1899) was an English bookseller, publisher and botanist. Hunneman introduced many non-native European plants to the United Kingdom.

Born in 1806 in Chelsea, Pamplin was the son of William Pamplin (1768–1844), a nurseryman.

Pamplin wrote for the Magazine of Natural History, and became editor of The Phytologist, owned by John Hunneman. Pamplin married his daughter Caroline, and took over the magazine.

Pamplin was also involved with the explorer Ludwig Leichhardt.

Notes

1806 births
1899 deaths
English botanists
Publishers (people) from London
19th-century English businesspeople